I Heart Davao (International title: My Sweet Heart) is a 2017 Philippine television drama romance series broadcast by GMA Network. Directed by Marlon N. Rivera, it stars Carla Abellana and Tom Rodriguez. It premiered on June 26, 2017 on the network's Telebabad line up replacing Meant to Be. The series concluded on August 18, 2017 with a total of 40 episodes. It was replaced by My Korean Jagiya in its timeslot.

The series is streaming online on YouTube.

Premise
Hope, a heart transplant recipient goes to Davao City to save her family's chocolate business. She meets Ponce who is the ex-boyfriend of her heart donor.

Cast and characters

Lead cast
 Carla Abellana as Hope Villanueva-Torres
 Tom Rodriguez as Ponce Torres

Supporting cast
 Benjamin Alves as Paul Gutierrez
 Betong Sumaya as Patrick "Tasoy" Alcancez
 Maey Bautista as Judith Bueno-Alcancez
 Catherine Remperas as Aileen Ayuban / Dorothy
 Ricardo Cepeda as Manolo Torres
 Phillip Lazaro as Vicencio "Vic"/ Vivenca "Venks" Sumpak
 Racquel Villavicencio as Helena Veronica "Helen" Villanueva
 Glenda Garcia as Mary Prudence "Pru" Villanueva
 Joel Saracho as Manuel Ayuban
 Geraldine Villamil as Mila Fostanes-Ayuban
 Nats Sitoy as Jenny Ayuban
 Kevin Sagra as Teban

Guest cast
 Patricia Tumulak as Maxine "Max" San Agustin
 Rez Cortez as Judith's father
 Ces Quesada as Judith's mother
 Zoren Legaspi as Eugene "Euge" Lumbas

Episodes

June 2017

July 2017

August 2017

Ratings
According to AGB Nielsen Philippines' Nationwide Urban Television Audience Measurement, the pilot episode of I Heart Davao earned a
7.4% rating. While the final episode scored a 6.5% rating. The series had its highest rating on July 28, 2017 with an 8.3% rating.

References

External links
 
 

2017 Philippine television series debuts
2017 Philippine television series endings
Filipino-language television shows
GMA Network drama series
GMA Integrated News and Public Affairs shows
Philippine romantic comedy television series
Television shows set in Davao City